Hartismere Rural District was a rural district in the county of East Suffolk, England. It was expanded in 1934 by merging with the disbanded Hoxne Rural District with a slight readjustment of boundaries. It was named after the ancient Hundred of Hartismere and administered from Eye.

Since 1 April 1974 it has formed part of the District of Mid Suffolk.

At the time of its dissolution it consisted of 52 civil parishes.

Statistics

Parishes

References

History of Suffolk
Local government in Suffolk
Districts of England created by the Local Government Act 1894
Districts of England abolished by the Local Government Act 1972
Rural districts of England